Maynard '64 is an album released by Canadian jazz trumpeter Maynard Ferguson collecting tracks recorded between 1959 and 1962 which was originally released on the Roulette label.

Reception 

AllMusic reviewer Scott Yanow stated "the boppish performances feature such soloists as altoist Lanny Morgan, the tenors of Willie Maiden and Don Menza and pianist Mike Abene. The arrangements took advantage of the band's many strengths and the result is a solid set of swinging music".

Track listing 
All compositions by Willie Maiden except where noted.

 "For the Cats" – 2:46
 "Vignette" – 2:52
 "New Bag Blues" (Mike Abene) – 3:07
 "Easy Chair" (Don Sebesky) – 3:59
 "My Sweetie Went Away, She Didn't Say Where, When, or Why" (Rey Turk, Lou Handman) – 2:51
 "Animated Suspension" – 2:22
 "Saturday Night (Is the Loneliest Night of the Week)" (Jule Styne, Sammy Cahn) – 2:47
 "Great Guns" (Ernie Wilkins) – 5:17
 "Do Nothing till You Hear from Me" (Duke Ellington, Bob Russell) – 2:20
Recorded in New York City on February 26, 1959 (track 9), January 20, 1961 (track 7), early 1962 (tracks 5 & 8) and March 1962 (tracks 1–4 & 6)

Personnel 
Maynard Ferguson – trumpet, leader
Bill Berry (track 7), Bill Chase (track 9), Gene Coe (tracks 1–6 & 8), Don Ellis (track 9), Rolf Ericson (track 7), Chet Ferretti (track 7), Larry Moser (track 9), Natale Pavone (tracks 1–6 & 8), Don Rader (tracks 1–6 & 8) – trumpet
John Gale (tracks 1–6 & 8), Slide Hampton (track 9), Kenny Rupp (tracks 1–8), Don Sebesky (track 9), Ray Winslow (track 7) – trombone
Jimmy Ford  (track 9), Lanny Morgan (tracks 1–8) – alto saxophone
Joe Farrell (track 7), Carmen Leggio (track 9), Willie Maiden, Don Menza (tracks 1–6 & 8) – tenor saxophone
Frank Hittner (tracks 1–8), John Lanni (track 9) – baritone saxophone, bass clarinet
Mike Abene (tracks 1–6 & 8), Jaki Byard (track 7), Bob Dogan (track 9) – piano
Linc Milliman (tracks 1–6 & 8), Jimmy Rowser (track 9), Charlie Sanders (track 7) – bass
Frankie Dunlop (track 9), Rufus Jones (tracks 1–8) – drums
Mike Abene (tracks 3 & 5), Jaki Byard (track 7), Willie Maiden (tracks 1, 2, 6 & 9), Don Sebesky (track 4), Ernie Wilkins (track 8) – arrangers

References 

1963 albums
Maynard Ferguson albums
Roulette Records albums
Albums produced by Teddy Reig
Albums arranged by Ernie Wilkins
Albums arranged by Don Sebesky